The Jumpinpin channel also known as The Pin lies between North Stradbroke Island and South Stradbroke Island.  It has a fast moving tidal deep water channel not appropriate for swimming but is popular with beach anglers.

The name Jumpinpin is a Yugambeh word meaning Pandanus root.

The bar area is shallow for a kilometre or so offshore so current local knowledge is required to safely transit the bar.

The area around the Pin is constantly changing with sand being deposited in one place after being moved by currents from another area. Just recently the mouth of Swan Bay was moved several hundred metres seaward creating an entirely new boating area.

The area is not really suitable for swimming as big tides and fast currents are the norm. Inland from the bar the Pin area consists of mangroves and mud banks, constantly being built up and then being washed away. In recent years Rat Island, The Mud Clump and Squire Island have disappeared.

Formation

A channel in the general area of Jumpinpin may have formed and silted up several times over recent millennia, however, the most recent formation of the channel is generally blamed on two events. The first of these was the wreck of the Cambus Wallace, a 75 m steel barque of 1534 tonnes built in 1894 at Port Glasgow. In the early morning of 3 September 1894, the Cambus Wallace ran aground in heavy seas near what was then a narrow stretch of Stradbroke Island called Tuleen. Most of the crew managed to swim to shore, but six men drowned and were buried on the beach. The ship broke up where she struck and most of the cargo was washed ashore and plundered by local residents. During the subsequent cleanup, explosives from the cargo were piled up and deliberately detonated on the beach leaving large craters. The explosion is credited with severely damaging the beach and weakening the loosely vegetated sand dunes.

Following gradual erosion of the seaward side of the island over the next two years, the second event to ultimately generate the channel at Jumpinpin was the arrival of a cyclone in 1896. Thomas Welsby, writing in 1921, noted, "Within two years (1896) the southeast gales threw again their power and fury on the very spot whereat the Cambus Wallace had come to grief, drove the rollers and breakers against the sandy hillside until it conquered and made passage into Swan Bay." Welsby contradicts himself stating that "The break at Jumpinpin occurred in May, 1898, the first official reporting being under date 13 May, coming from Mr Andrew Graham, Government official, Southport"

TC Luita passed east of Brisbane 6–7 March 1898, producing gales and very high seas along the South Coast.

Newspaper reports indicate that the passage was established in 1898.  A sizeable breakthrough had taken place by that year.  "News has now been received that the action of the recent gales on the coast, coupled with the abnormally high tides, about Sunday and Monday, May 8 and 9, has effected a clean breach through the island, and there is now a deep channel about half a mile wide at Jumping Pin."

Changes to tidal inundation in the area around the mouth of the Logan River were dramatic.  Erosion occurred on farm land and some farmers resorted to building canals.  The oyster industry in the area was also affected by what was claimed to be changes in the water density interfering with the ability of the oysters to settle on the seafloor.

Fishing
The 'Pin is renowned for fishing with huge catches of Bream, Flathead, Whiting, Luderick, Tailor and Trevally being made in season. Numerous Mulloway have been caught here. A few kilometres to the west of the bar an area known locally as Lew's Folly, produces large quantities of bream and flathead in season.

Other areas known for their bream and flathead catches are Whalley's Gutter, Tiger Mullet Channel and Tree Gone Bay. Access is only by boat, however 4WD vehicles can access the southern tip of North Stradbroke Island, but the beach fishing is limited here.

See also

Gold Coast Seaway
Moreton Bay

References

Channels of Australia
South East Queensland
North Stradbroke Island